A music lesson is a type of formal instruction in playing an instrument or singing.

Music Lesson may also refer to:

The Music Lesson, a 17th-century painting by Johannes Vermeer
The Music Lesson (Fragonard), a c. 1770 painting by Jean-Honore Fragonard
The Music Lesson (Leighton), an 1877 painting by Frederic Leighton
The Music Lesson (Matisse), a 1917 painting by Henri Matisse
The Music Lesson, a painting by the workshop of Gerard ter Borch the Younger formerly in the Hope Collection of Pictures
The Music Lesson: A Spiritual Search for Growth Through Music, a novel by bass virtuoso Victor Wooten

See also
Music (disambiguation)
Lesson (disambiguation)